"Frente a frente" is a 1990 song recorded by Brasilian duet Chico & Roberta. Written by Chico & Roberta and Loalwa Braz with a music by Daniel Darras and Alain Pyge, and produced by Jean-Claude Bonaventure, who previously produced Kaoma's "Lambada", it was the debut single from the band's first album Frente a frente, released in 1991, on which it appears as the first track. It was successful, becoming a top five hit.

According to Elia Habib, an expert of the French chart, "Frente a frente" has a "sunny melody" which recalled Dalida's 1976 hit single "Besame mucho".

Chart performance
"Frente a frente" first charted in the Netherlands, in August and September 1990, remaining for eight weeks on the Dutch Single Top 100 with a peak of number 36 in its fifth week of presence. In France, it debuted at number 37 on the chart edition of 20 October 1990, reached the top ten five weeks later, peaked at number five for non-consecutive three weeks, and totalled 17 weeks in the top twenty and 25 weeks in the top 50, thus becoming the band's longest single chart run. It achieved Gold status, awarded by the Syndicat National de l'Édition Phonographique, the French certificator, for over 400,000 units sold. It charted for 18 weeks on the Eurochart Hot 100 and peaked at number 29 in its seventh week.

Track listings

 CD single - France, Germany
 "Frente a frente" (extended version) — 6:10
 "Frente a frente" (single version) — 3:30
 "Feijão" — 3:50

 7" single - France, Germany, Denmark, Italy, Portugal
 "Frente a frente" (single version) — 3:30
 "Feijão" — 3:50

 12" maxi - Spain, Italy
 "Frente a frente" (extended version) — 6:10
 "Feijão" — 3:50

 12" maxi - France, Greece
 "Frente a frente" (extended version) — 6:10
 "Frente a frente" (single version) — 3:30

 Promo 12" maxi - Mexico
 "Frente a frente" (single version) — 3:30
 "Frente a frente" (album version) — 3:43

 Promo 7" single - Costa Rica
 "Frente a frente" (album version) — 3:43

Charts and sales

Weekly charts

Certifications

Release history

References

1990 songs
1990 debut singles
Chico & Roberta songs
Male–female vocal duets